The 2023 Cork Premier Senior Football Championship is scheduled to be the fourth staging of the Cork Premier Senior Football Championship and the 135th staging overall of a championship for the top-ranking Gaelic football teams in Cork. The draw for the group stage placings took place on 11 December 2022. The championship is scheduled to run from June to October 2023.

Nemo Rangers will enter the championship as the defending champions.

Team changes

To Championship

Promoted from the Cork Senior A Football Championship
 St. Michael's

From Championship

Relegated to the Cork Senior A Football Championship
 Newcestown

Group A

Group A table

Group B

Group B table

Group C

Group C table

Knockout stage

Relegation playoff

Quarter-finals

Semi-finals

Final

References

External links
 Cork GAA website

Cork Premier Senior Football Championship
Cork Senior Football Championship
Cork Premier Senior Football Championship